Moskovsky District is a district of the federal city of St. Petersburg, Russia. As of the 2010 Census, its population was 288,744; up from 275,884 recorded in the 2002 Census.

History
The district was established in 1919.

The 2nd People's Militia Division was formed rapidly in this district in 1941 in the face of the advancing German armies.

Municipal divisions
Moskovsky District comprises the following five municipal okrugs:
Gagarinskoye
Moskovskaya zastava
Novoizmaylovskoye
Pulkovsky meridian
Zvyozdnoye

References

Notes

Sources